

This is a list of the National Register of Historic Places listings in Mississippi County, Arkansas.

This is intended to be a complete list of the properties and districts on the National Register of Historic Places in Mississippi County, Arkansas, United States.

There are 44 properties and districts listed on the National Register in the county, including 2 National Historic Landmarks. Another two properties were once listed but have been removed.

Current listings

|}

Former listings

|}

See also

List of National Historic Landmarks in Arkansas
National Register of Historic Places listings in Arkansas

References

 
Mississippi County